Mohammed Jabbar Shokan (born 21 May 1993 in Basra, Iraq) is an Iraqi footballer who plays as a forward for Al-Minaa in the Iraqi Premier League.

International career
On 24 July 2016, Shokan won his first international cap with Iraq against Uzbekistan in a friendly match.

International goals 
Scores and results list Iraq's goal tally first.

Honours

International
Iraq U-23
 AFC U-22 Championship: 2013

References

External links
 

1993 births
Living people
Association football midfielders
Iraqi footballers
Iraq international footballers
Iraqi expatriate sportspeople in Jordan
Iraqi expatriate footballers
Sportspeople from Basra
Al-Mina'a SC players
Erbil SC players
Al-Quwa Al-Jawiya players
Al-Ramtha SC players
Al-Shorta SC players
Iraq youth international footballers